Ryki  is a town in eastern Poland between Warsaw and Lublin. It has 9,767 inhabitants (as of 2007). Situated in the Lublin Voivodeship (since 1999). It is the capital of Ryki County. Ryki belongs to Lesser Poland, and historically is part of Ziemia Stężycka (The Land of Stężyca, an ancient county, the only part of historic Sandomierz Voivodeship which was located on the right bank of the Vistula river). The town is located in the northwest corner of Lublin Voivodeship. The distance to the Polish capital is 100 km, the distance to Lublin – 64 km. Its name first appears in documents in 1439 as Riki.

History 
The first urban center of this part of Lesser Poland was located in Sieciechów, whose parish church controlled areas both east and west of the Vistula. In the 14th century, Sieciechów’s significance diminished, and in the mid-15th century, the County of Stężyca was created, as part of Sandomierz Voivodeship. The royal village of Ryki (Riki), which belonged to the County of Stężyca, was first mentioned in 1424. In 1570, Ryki had a wooden church of St. Jacob the Apostle, as well as a parish school. In 1591 a hospital was founded, and the seat of a starosta was established here. Ryki received its city charter in 1782 but lost it in 1810.

Until the Third Partition of Poland, Ryki remained in Sandomierz Voivodeship. Then, between 1795 and 1809, it briefly belonged to Austrian Empire’s province of West Galicia. During the Napoleonic Wars, the town became part of the Duchy of Warsaw, later Congress Poland, governed by the Russians. It was an important center of Chassidic movement, and in 1908, Jews made 94% of town’s population. On August 2, 1919, Ryki was added to Garwolin County, part of Lublin Voivodeship. Garwolin County became part of Warsaw Voivodeship on 1 April 1939.

During World War II, the Jewish residents of the town—between 3,000-4,000 Jews—were murdered in the Holocaust, either in Treblinka extermination camp, or Sobibor extermination camp. Some Jewish children, such as Shloime Judensznajder (now Solly Irving), were rescued by Polish families. Their descendants live currently in Poland, the UK and Israel.

The town and its county was a major center of Home Army, whose units liberated Ryki on July 26, 1944. After the war, Ryki belonged to Warsaw Voivodeship, and in 1975, the town was moved again to Lublin Voivodeship. In 2000, FM- and TV-mast Ryki was built. Ryki again officially became a town in 1957.

Today Ryki is an important road junction. In the neighboring village of Moszczanka, two national roads cross – the 48th (Kock – Tomaszów Mazowiecki), and the 17th (Lublin – Warsaw). The town has a rail station, and bus connections with several locations.

Famous namesakes 
The surname of Hyman G. Rickover, a US Navy Admiral and considered the Father of the Nuclear Navy, is derived from Ryki. Born in 1900 in Maków Mazowiecki, the young Rickover emigrated with his Jewish family in 1906 to the United States. The Admiral served on active duty for 63 years, longer than any other U.S. military officer.

References

Cities and towns in Lublin Voivodeship
Ryki County
Sandomierz Voivodeship
Lublin Governorate
Warsaw Voivodeship (1919–1939)
Holocaust locations in Poland